United States v. Johnson, 390 U.S. 563 (1968), was a United States Supreme Court case.

Background 
Defendants were indicted under the federal civil rights statute (18 USC 241) for a conspiracy to injure and intimidate three African Americans in the exercise of their right to patronize a restaurant under Title II of the Civil Rights Act of 1964. Defendants were outsiders not connected with the restaurant. The District Court granted a motion to dismiss the indictment on the ground that 207(b) of the Civil Rights Act of 1964 makes the provision for relief by injunction the exclusive remedy under the Act.  (269 F Supp 706)

Opinion of the Court 
Justice Douglas reversed for a 5-3 majority. He held that the provisions of 207(b) of the Civil Rights Act of 1964 making the remedies provided in Title II of the Act the exclusive means of enforcing rights based on such part do not preclude a criminal prosecution of the defendants under 18 USC 241, since the exclusive-remedy provision applies only to enforcement of substantive rights to public accommodations against proprietors and owners, and does not purport to deal with outsiders who use violence against those who assert their rights under the Act.

Dissent 
Justice Stewart dissented on the ground that the plain language of the exclusive remedies clause clearly precludes a criminal prosecution for interfering with rights secured by Title II of the Act.

External links
 

United States Supreme Court cases
United States Supreme Court cases of the Warren Court
1968 in United States case law
United States racial desegregation case law